Kirkenes (Skolt Sami: Ǩeârkknjargg; ;) is a town in Sør-Varanger Municipality in Troms og Finnmark county, in the far northeastern part of Norway. The town lies on a peninsula along the Bøkfjorden, an arm of the large Varangerfjorden. The main church for Kirkenes is Kirkenes Church, located in the Haganes area of the town. Kirkenes is located just a few kilometres from the Norway-Russia border.

When the neighbouring suburban villages of Hesseng, Sandnes, and Bjørnevatn are all included with Kirkenes, the urban area reaches a total population of almost 8,000 people.

Although Kirkenes is the Norwegian town closest to the Russian border, Vardø to its north is located further east in Norway.

History
The area around Kirkenes was a common Norwegian–Russian district until 1826, when the present border was settled. The original name of the peninsula was Piselvnes ("Pis River headland"), but this was changed to Kirkenes (meaning "church headland") after the Kirkenes Church was built here in 1862. Kirkenes was a village until 1998 when it received town status.

World War II

During the occupation of Norway by Nazi Germany, Kirkenes was one of the many bases for the German Kriegsmarine and the Luftwaffe's Jagdgeschwader 5, and apart from that, the area served as a main base for supplies to the Murmansk front (see Lapland War).

Reportedly, Kirkenes was second after Malta on a list of European towns experiencing air-raid alarms and attacks, with more than 1,000 alarms and 320 air attacks. The town was liberated by the Red Army on 25 October 1944 when the German Wehrmacht was pushed out and fled the area after having destroyed most of the remaining infrastructure. Only 13 houses survived the war.

Close to the town there is a memorial to 11 freedom fighters who helped the partisans collect information about the German occupation. In the summer of 1943, their activities were discovered and many of them were sent to a prisoner-of-war camp near Kirkenes. Following a court-martial the 11 were sentenced to death and were killed near the memorial spot on 18 August 1943. When the common grave was opened in 1946 it was found that the men had been beaten to death. Following the post mortem and memorial service, the bodies were returned to their homesteads.

Demographics

The majority of the inhabitants of Kirkenes are of a Norwegian background, and a minority are Sami. Others are originally from Finland, either members of the Kven population or of a newer influx of more or less recent Finnish immigrants. Also, about 500 people are relatively recent Russian immigrants. For several months in 2015, the town served as a border crossing point for Syrian refugees, with hundreds per week crossing the border on bicycles, traveled into Norway from Russia (via Murmansk and Nikel).

Geography
Kirkenes is located in the extreme northeastern part of Norway on the Bøkfjorden, a branch of the Varangerfjorden, which is a vast bay connected to the Barents Sea near the Russian–Norwegian border.

Kirkenes is located just east of the 30th meridian east. As a result, it is further east than Istanbul, which marks one of the European borders with Asia. The easternmost point of Norway and the municipality is also at a point further east than Saint Petersburg.

Unlike the vast majority of Norway, Kirkenes is located east of the neighbouring country of Finland. Because of this, travelling directly west from Kirkenes actually changes the time zone forward instead of backward, as it usually does. Travelling directly east from Kirkenes (into Russia) changes the time zone forward by an hour in summer, but by two in winter. When Russia implemented permanent daylight saving time between 2011 and 2014, there was a three-hour difference travelling forward from the eastern part of the municipality to westerly Russian areas during winter. Kirkenes shares time zone with areas much further west, e.g. Galicia in Spain which has a solar time difference of 2½ hours.

There are only a few such places in the world. It is forbidden, according to both Norwegian and Russian law, to circumambulate the border marker, as the only lawful route across the Norwegian–Russian border is at the border control at Storskog.

Climate
The midnight sun shines from May 17 to July 21. The corresponding polar night extends from November 21 to January 21. Despite its location at the coast, Kirkenes exhibits a more continental subarctic climate (Dfc) than further west along the Northern Norwegian coast. This is due to less maritime air from the west reaching across the land east to Kirkenes. The all-time high  was recorded in July 1972 and the record low  in January 1999. Due to its cool summers vegetation is typical of the northern taiga, with forest of pine and birch. The average date for the last overnight freeze (low below ) in spring is 26 May and average date for first freeze in autumn is 22 September  giving a frost-free season of 116 days (Kirkenes Airport, 1981-2010 average). Considering its latitude the climate is still mild.

Economy and tourism

Kirkenes is close to Norway's border with Russia, and this location influences the local economy. The Norwegian Barents Secretariat, which works to promote Norwegian-Russian collaboration, is located in Kirkenes.

In 2010, Norway's and Russia's Foreign Ministers signed an agreement that made it easier for 9,000 Norwegians and 45,000 Russians living near the common border to visit each other.

Tourist attractions include Grenselandmuseet (The Border Area Museum), which shows the history of war and peace along the Norwegian–Russian border, Sami art exhibitions by the artist John Savio (1902–1938), and a history of the mining industry in the area. The museum has a small shop and café. Almost every last Thursday of each month the Russian Market takes place on the central square where traders from Murmansk sell their merchandise. Here you can find everything from matryoshkas, linen cloths, and handicrafts, to Russian crystal and porcelain dishes.

Just outside Kirkenes is a military base that is home to the Garrison of Sør-Varanger at Høybuktmoen. Connected to this base are the six border stations along the Russian border. This base and these border stations are there to protect against illegal immigrants as well as other illegal activities across the border. The only public border crossing is at Storskog, southeast of Kirkenes.

In the city centre of Kirkenes is Andersgrotta, a vast underground bunker built during World War II that provided shelter to the town's residents. Tours of the bunker are available.

A pride parade held in 2017 in Kirkenes attracted participants from neighbouring Russia, who were unwilling to participate in LGBT events in Russia due to hostility from the government and police. In addition, the parade saw participants from Amnesty International and the Norwegian Helsinki Committee.

Kirkenes's location on the Northeast Passage and the effect of climate change on sea ice have led to expressions of interest to develop port and transport infrastructure in the town, including from state-owned enterprises of China. Public reception to such projects in Kirkenes is mixed.

Cruise ships have in 2022, stopped using the port at Kirkenes; ship owners consider the port to be too close to Russia.

Transportation

Kirkenes is one end of the route of the Hurtigruten, which cruises daily up and down the Norway coast to and from Bergen. Kirkenes is served by Kirkenes Airport, Høybuktmoen. There are non-stop flights to Oslo, Vadsø, Vardø, Alta and Tromsø. The European route E6 has its northern terminus at Kirkenes. The northern terminus of the European route E105 highway is located in Hesseng, just south of the town.

Kirkenes is also the terminus of Kirkenes–Bjørnevatn Line, the world's second-most northerly railway line, used to transport iron ore from the mines at Bjørnevatn to the port at Kirkenes. The proposed Arctic Railway would see Kirkenes connected with northern Finland.

The town of Kirkenes is also the starting point of EV13 The Iron Curtain Trail, a cycling route that runs along the historic border between the capitalist West and the communist East during the Cold War.

Sister cities
 Nikel, Murmansk Oblast, Russia
 Kars, Kars Province, Turkey

Notable people

 Turid Balke (1921–2000) a Norwegian actress, playwright and artist
 Arnfinn Laudal (born 1936) a Norwegian mathematician
 Per Oskar Kjølaas (born 1948) Bishop of the Diocese of Nord-Hålogaland from 2002 to 2014
 Roger Ryberg (born 1952) a Norwegian politician
 Morten Strøksnes (born 1965) a journalist and non-fiction writer
 Jarle Vespestad (born 1966) a Norwegian jazz musician 
 Simen Johan (born 1973) a Norwegian-Swedish contemporary artist, photographer and sculptor living in New York City
 Yvonne Wartiainen (born 1976) a painter, mixing figurative shapes with abstract motives
 Ørjan Nilsen (born 1982) a producer and DJ
Sport
 Grethe Mathiesen (born 1956) a swimmer, competed at the 1972 Summer Olympics in the women's 100 metre freestyle
 Kirsten Borgen (born 1957) is a Norwegian sport wrestler
 Vegard Ulvang (born 1963) a cross-country skier who won three Olympic gold medals, two silver, and one bronze
 Vegard Sannes (born 1976) a retired football midfielder, 125 club caps with FK Bodø/Glimt
 John Kristian Dahl (born 1981) three times Vasaloppet winner

See also
List of towns and cities in Norway
Nazi concentration camps in Norway

References

External links

 Tourist information: www.visitkirkenes.no
 Sør Varanger municipality: Forsiden - Sør-Varanger kommune
 Sør-Varanger climate statistics from met.no.

Populated places in Troms og Finnmark
Cities and towns in Norway
Port cities and towns in Norway
Barents Sea
Sør-Varanger
Populated places of Arctic Norway